Christian Haselberger (born 2 June 1989) is an Austrian football coach and a former player. He is currently working as a academy coach at LASK.

Career

Coaching career
In the summer 2020, Haselberger was appointed assistant coach of Austrian fourth-tier club SC Pinkafeld. In September 2021, he made his comeback on the pitch, appearing in 12 games for the team, while still maintaining his position as assistant coach.

In June 2022, he became a youth coach at LASK.

References

External links
 
 

Living people
1989 births
Austrian footballers
Austria youth international footballers
FK Austria Wien players
SC Wiener Neustadt players
FC Lustenau players
Kapfenberger SV players
Floridsdorfer AC players
FC Mauerwerk players
SV Horn players
Austrian Football Bundesliga players
2. Liga (Austria) players
Austrian Regionalliga players
Association football midfielders
Austrian football managers
People from Melk
Footballers from Lower Austria